The EFL League One Player of the Month is an association football award that recognises the player adjudged the best for each month of the season in EFL League One, the third tier of English football. Originally named the Football League One Player of the Month award, it replaced the Second Division Player of the Month as League One replaced the Second Division in 2004, and in 2016, when the Football League rebranded itself as the English Football League (EFL), the award was renamed accordingly. From the 2010–11 season, the Football League was sponsored by nPower, so it was known as the nPower League One Player of the Month award. As of the 2013–14 season, the league has been sponsored by Skybet, so it is now the SkyBet Player of the Month award.  The awards are designed and manufactured in the UK by bespoke awards company Gaudio Awards.

List of winners

 Each year in the table below is linked to the corresponding football season.

Multiple winners
Up to and including the October 2022 award.
 The table lists all the players who have won more than once.

Awards won by nationality
Up to and including the February 2023 award.

Awards won by club
Up to and including the February 2023 award.

See also
Football League One Manager of the Month
Football League Championship Player of the Month
Football League Two Player of the Month

References

Association football player of the month awards
English Football League trophies and awards
Player of the Month